Furcula is a genus of moths of the family Notodontidae. The genus was described by Jean-Baptiste Lamarck in 1816.

Species
Furcula bicuspis (Borkhausen, 1790)
Furcula furcula (Clerck, 1759)
Furcula bifida (Brahm, 1787)
Furcula aeruginosa 
Furcula tibetana Schintlmeister, 1998
Furcula nicetia (Schaus, 1928)
Furcula interrupta (Christoph, 1867)
Furcula borealis (Guérin-Méneville, 1832) (was treated as a subspecies of F. bicuspis for some time)
Furcula cinerea (Walker, 1865)
Furcula nivea (Neumoegen, 1891)
Furcula occidentalis (Lintner, 1878) (was treated as a subspecies of F. furcula for some time)
Furcula scolopendrina (Boisduval, 1869)
Furcula modesta (Hudson, 1891)

References

Notodontidae